Middle Finger may refer to:
 Middle finger
 The Finger, an offensive gesture
 "Middle Finger" (song), a 2011 song by Cobra Starship
 Middle Finger (mountain), a mountain in British Columbia, Canada